Nagayon Pagoda (also known as Nagayon Temple) is a Buddhist temple in Amarapura, a former royal capital in Mandalay Region, Myanmar (Burma). The temple was built by Anauk Nanmadaw Ma Mya Lay, the Queen of the Western Palace during the reign of Bagyidaw, during the first half of the 1800s. The temple's exterior is known for its unusual design. The roof of the temple is draped by the naga Mucalinda, who protected the Buddha from the elements while achieving enlightenment.

Gallery

See also 

 Kyaung

References 

Buddhist temples in Myanmar

19th-century Buddhist temples